Malaxis warmingii   is a species of orchid native to Brazil.

References

Orchids of Brazil
Plants described in 1878
warmingii